Léonide-Nestor-Arthur Ricard was a politician in the Quebec, Canada. He served as Member of the Legislative Assembly.

Early life

He was born on July 24, 1882 in Saint-Barnabé-Nord, Mauricie.

Provincial Politics

Ricard was elected as a Liberal candidate to the Legislative Assembly of Quebec in a 1920 by-election, representing the district of Saint-Maurice. He succeeded Georges-Isidore Delisle who had recently died. He was re-elected in 1923.

Death

He died in office on June 20, 1924 in Berthierville.

References

1882 births
1924 deaths
Quebec Liberal Party MNAs